Iain Chisholm (born 29 August 1985) is a Scottish footballer who played 'senior' for Albion Rovers, Dumbarton and East Stirling.

Honours
Dumbarton

Scottish Division Three (fourth tier): Winners 2008–09

References

1985 births
Scottish footballers
Dumbarton F.C. players
Albion Rovers F.C. players
East Stirlingshire F.C. players
Scottish Football League players
Living people
Association football utility players